The Nikola Tesla electric car anecdote refers to a supposed invention described by Peter Savo, who claimed to be a nephew of Nikola Tesla, to Derek Ahers in 1967. According to the story, Tesla modified a Pierce-Arrow car in Buffalo, New York in 1931 by removing the gasoline engine and replacing it with a brushless AC electric motor. The motor was purportedly powered by a "cosmic energy power receiver" contained in a box measuring 25 inches by 10 inches by 6 inches, which contained 12 radio vacuum tubes and was connected to a 6-foot-long antenna. The car was claimed to have been driven for about 50 miles at speeds of up to 90 mph over an eight-day period.

The story has been subject to debate because of the lack of physical evidence to confirm the existence of the car and the fact that Tesla did not have a nephew named Peter Savo. Tesla's grand-nephew William Terbo has also dismissed the Tesla electric car story as a fabrication.

A number of web pages exist that perpetuate this tale. The continuous recycling of reactive power is not one of them for lack of verifiable evidence to prove otherwise. Yet, if it were powered (for the most part) by the reuse of reactive power, then this would require a thorough review of these anecdotes to determine if an extremely high Quality Factor is responsible for significantly offsetting power losses. Until any conclusive evidence is found, all we can do is engage in endless speculation as a form of mild entertainment.

With the exception of these points, every other account of this purported demonstration automobile is based solely on the Peter Savo story with additional embellishments added by subsequent retellings.

References

Further reading

More Insight into the Tesla Car 
Essentia Volume 2 Winter 1981: Exemplar - Nikola Tesla 
Nikola Tesla's amazing "black box" 
Cold Electricity or Cosmic Rays of Tesla's 1931 Pierce Arrow Top Secret Project 
ExtraOrdinary Technology: Volume 1 Number 2 
Simulating Tesla's Pierce Arrow EV Demonstration of 1931
Aluminum-Air (Primary) Battery Development - Toward an Electric Car

External links
 Interesting Facts About Nikola Tesla

Electric vehicles
Nikola Tesla
Hoaxes in science
Hoaxes in the United States
1960s hoaxes